Ménaka (Bambara: ߡߋߣߊߞߊ ߘߌߣߋߖߊ tr. Menaka Dineja) is a region of Mali legislatively created in 2012 from the cercle of the same name previously part of Gao Region. Actual implementation of the region began on 19 January 2016 with the appointment of Daouda Maïga as the region's governor. Members of the region's transitional council were appointed on 14 October 2016. The region is divided into four cercles: Andéramboukane, Inékar, Tidermène, and Ménaka, the location of the capital, also called Ménaka.

References

 
Regions of Mali
States and territories established in 2016
2016 establishments in Mali